Charles Center station is an underground 2 floor Metro SubwayLink station in Baltimore, Maryland making it the largest station on the line. Located at the Charles Center in Downtown Baltimore, it is a downtown transportation hub serving many bus lines, nearby various landmarks, and bus transfers. It was the final stop of the line until 1995, when the extension to Johns Hopkins Hospital opened. The station is in close proximity to CFG Bank Arena as well as the Baltimore Arena station on the Light RailLink. The station has two street level entrances via escalators and elevators and is the center most station on the line serving Central Downtown Baltimore.

History
Originally designated as the metro system's central hub, Charles Center was planned to have a stacked station design to allow for transferring between east–west and north–south lines.

Station layout

Bus Connections 
1 - Sinai Hospital / Mondawmin (M) Station or Fort McHenry 
3 - Cromwell Bridge Park & Ride / Sheppard Pratt Hospital
5 - Mondawmin (M) Station or Cedonia
8 - University Maryland Transit Center or Lutherville (L) Station
10 - Catonsville / Paradise or Dundalk
11 - Towson or Canton
20 - Security Square Mall or C.C.B.C. Dundalk / Marine Terminal
23 - Catonsville / Wildwood or Fox Ridge
30 - Edmondson Village or City Hall / Hopkins Bayview
35 - UMBC / Blind Industries or White Marsh
36 - Riverview or Northern Pkwy.
40 (Quickbus) - Security Blvd. @ C.M.S. or Middle River
46 (Quickbus) - Paradise or Cedonia
48 (Quickbus) - University Medical Transit Center or Towson
61 - Lake Avenue or Inner Harbor
64 - North Avenue or Curtis Bay / Energy Parkway / Riviera Beach
91 - Sinai Hospital or City Hall
120 (Express) - Johns Hopkins Hospital or White Marsh
150 (Express) - City Hall or Columbia
160 (Express) - Johns Hopkins Hospital or Whispering Woods / Fox Ridge
310 (Commuter) - Johns Hopkins Hospital or Columbia)
410 (Commuter) - State Center (M) Station or Churchville / Belair
411 (Commuter) - Johns Hopkins Hospital (SB)/ Hickory or Belair (NB)
420 (Commuter) - Johns Hopkins Hospital or Havre de Grace
Charm City Circulator Purple Route

References

External links

Hanover Street entrance from Google Maps Street View
 Charles Street entrance from Google Maps Street View

Metro SubwayLink stations
Railway stations in the United States opened in 1983
1983 establishments in Maryland
Railway stations in Baltimore